Zuleh (also Romanized as Zūleh) is a village in Tarhan-e Gharbi Rural District, Tarhan District, Kuhdasht County, Lorestan Province, Iran. At the 2006 census, its population was 287, in 52 families.

References 

Towns and villages in Kuhdasht County